Chasse et Pêche is a French television channel dedicated to hunting and fishing.

History of the channel
Created in April 1996 for the AB Sat package, Chasse et Pêche is a channel dedicated to hunting and fishing for sport, and those who enjoy them.

Its rival is the channel Seasons.

Capital
Chasse et Pêche is owned by AB Sat SA and has a budget of €24 million, provided 100% by AB Groupe.

Programmes
The theme of the channel is all types of fishing and hunting around the world. With 20 hours per day of programming, Chasse et Pêche deals with all those who are interested in the topic, whether professional or amateur, as well as the landscape and nature in which they take place. The programming alternates hourly between hunting and fishing.

Shows
Pêche Passion is shown on Tuesday and Wednesday at 19:00
Chasse Passion is shown on Monday and Thursday at 18:30
Destination Pêche is shown on Thursday at 19:00
Celtic Nature is shown on Sunday at 19:30

Broadcast
Chasse et Pêche was originally only shown on AB Sat, but is now available through a contract on French, Belgian, and Swiss cable and on the Bis TV packages. Canalsat does not broadcast it, as it is in competition with their channel, Seasons. Chasse & Pêche was made available on Canalsat between 2008 and 2009. On 8 November 2016, at the merger of Canalsat and Les Chaînes Canal+ to form Canal, Chasse et Pêche was added to the Seasons and Crescendo option.

See also

 AB Groupe

External links
 Official site of the programme 
 Programmes on Chasse et Pêche 

Mediawan Thematics
Television channels and stations established in 1996
1996 establishments in France
French-language television stations
Television stations in France
Hunting in France
Fishing in France
Hunting in popular culture
Sports television networks in France